The First Jonckheer cabinet was the 1st cabinet of the Netherlands Antilles after the ratification of the 
Charter for the Kingdom of the Netherlands.

Composition
The cabinet was composed as follows:

|Minister of General Affairs
|Efrain Jonckheer
|DP
|8 December 1954
|-
|Minister of Finance
|Juan E. Irausquin
|PPA
|1 April 1956
|-
|rowspan="2"|Minister of Justice
|Frederick C.J. Beaujon
|PPA
|8 December 1954
|-
|S.W. van der Meer
|DP
|1 April 1956
|-
|rowspan="2"|Minister of Education and Popular Education
|A.E. Booi
|NPB
|8 December 1954
|-
|Frederick C.J. Beaujon
|PPA
|23 August 1958
|-
|rowspan="2"|Minister of Traffic and Communications
|Wem Lampe
|PPA
|8 December 1954
|-
|Frederick C.J. Beaujon
|PPA
|1 April 1956
|-
|rowspan="3"|Minister of Public Health
|S.W. van der Meer
|DP
|8 December 1954
|-
|A.E. Booi
|NPB
|23 July 1955
|-
|Frederick C.J. Beaujon
|PPA
|1 April 1956
|-
|rowspan="3"|Minister of Social Affairs
|S.W. van der Meer
|DP
|8 December 1954
|-
|Efrain Jonckheer
|DP
|1 April 1956
|-
|Ciro Domenico Kroon
|DP
|7 November 1957
|-
|rowspan="3"|Minister of Economic Affairs
|E.J. van Romondt
|COP
|8 December 1954
|-
|A.E. Booi
|NPB
|31 May 1957
|-
|Ciro Domenico Kroon
|DP
|5 December 1957
|-
|rowspan="3"|Minister of Welfare
|E.J. van Romondt
|COP
|8 December 1954
|-
|A.E. Booi
|NPB
|31 May 1957
|-
|Juan E. Irausquin
|PPA
|5 December 1957
|}

 DP - Democratische Partij op Curaçao
 PPA - Partido Patriotico di Aruba
 COP - Curaçaosche Onafhankelijke Partij
 NPB - Nationale Partij op Bonaire

References

Cabinets of the Netherlands Antilles
1954 establishments in the Netherlands Antilles
Cabinets established in 1954
Cabinets disestablished in 1958
1958 disestablishments in the Netherlands Antilles